Walter Sillers Jr. (April 13, 1888 – September 24, 1966) was an American lawyer, politician, landowner, and white supremacist. A legislative leader from Mississippi, he served as the 56th Speaker of the Mississippi House of Representatives. An outspoken white nationalist, Sillers has been referred to as one of the most racist political leaders in Mississippi's history. He was one of the wealthiest people to have ever served in the Mississippi legislature.

Background 
Sillers was born in Rosedale, Mississippi to Walter Sillers, Sr. and Florence Warfield Sillers. He was a brother of the columnist and segregationist Florence Sillers Ogden. A member of a prominent Mississippi Delta family, his paternal grandparents were planters and slaveholders in Rosedale. His maternal grandfather was Colonel Elisha Warfield, a planter and Confederate military officer who served in the 2nd Arkansas Infantry Regiment. He was a great-great grandson of Elisha Warfield and a great-grandnephew of Mary Jane Warfield Clay. He was a grandnephew of Charles Clark, a Confederate general who served as Governor of Mississippi.

Sillers grew up in Rosedale and was raised in the Methodist Episcopal Church. He lived with his family in a large Victorian-style mansion on Levee Street. He was educated at St. Andrew's-Sewanee School, an Episcopal boarding school in Sewanee, Tennessee. He attended the University of Mississippi and was a member of St. Anthony Hall.

Career 
Originally an attorney, Sillers was also a members of the American Bar Association.

He served in the Mississippi House of Representatives from 1916–1966. He served as Speaker of that body from January 4, 1944 until his death on September 24, 1966. He was a delegate to the Democratic National Conventions of 1916, 1924, 1944, 1948, 1952, and 1956.

He has been called "one of the most racist political leaders in Mississippi's history."

He inherited multiple plantations from his father and held interests in banks, oil companies, and other businesses in Mississippi. Due to his inheritance and business ventures, he was one of the wealthiest people to have ever served in the Mississippi legislature.

Naming and controversy 
Given Sillers' preeminence in the state legislature, several public buildings were named for him during his fifty years in office. The fine arts complex was named after him at the historically black Mississippi Valley State University. The Walter Sillers State Office Building, a government high-rise in Jackson, Mississippi is also named after him.

Delta State University's Walter Sillers Coliseum, built in 1960 with proceeds from a sale of bonds which Sillers opposed, has also come under scrutiny, with public calls for the building to be named after Lusia Harris instead, an African American woman who led the Delta State Lady Statesmen basketball team to three consecutive national championships and became the first and only woman ever drafted into the NBA.

Sillers himself, an outspoken white supremacist, advocated for the removal of the names of white namesakes from public spaces should they become integrated.

Personal 
On November 22, 1911, he married Lena Roberts. He was a member of the Freemasons and the Shriners. Sillers died at the age of 79 on September 24, 1966. He was buried at Beulah Cemetery in Beulah, Mississippi.

References

External links
 

1888 births
1966 deaths
20th-century American landowners
Methodists from Mississippi
Mississippi lawyers
People from Rosedale, Mississippi
Speakers of the Mississippi House of Representatives
Democratic Party members of the Mississippi House of Representatives
20th-century American politicians
Neo-Confederates
Walter
20th-century American lawyers